Very few texts in Judaism refer to or take note of the Islamic prophet, Muhammad. Those that do generally reject Muhammad's proclamation of receiving divine revelations from God and label him instead as a false prophet.

References to Muhammad

In the Middle Ages, it was common for Jewish writers to describe Muhammad as ha-meshuggah ("the madman"), a term of contempt frequently used in the Bible for those who believe themselves to be prophets.

Maimonides

Maimonides referred to Muhammad as a false prophet and an insane man. In his Epistle to Yemen he wrote "After [Jesus] arose the Madman who emulated his precursor [Jesus], since he paved the way for him. But he added the further objective of procuring rule and submission [talb al-mulk; pursuit of sovereignty] and he invented what was well known [Islam]."

In his authoritative work of law the Mishneh Torah (Hilkhot Melakhim 11:10–12), Maimonides indicated that nevertheless Muhammad was part of God's plan of preparing the world for the coming of the Jewish Messiah: "All those words of Jesus of Nazareth and of this Ishmaelite [i.e., Muhammad] who arose after him are only to make straight the path for the messianic king and to prepare the whole world to serve the Lord together. As it is said: 'For then I will change the speech of the peoples to a pure speech so that all of them shall call on the name of the Lord and serve him with one accord' (Zephaniah 3:9)."

Obscure and indirect references
Natan'el al-Fayyumi, a prominent 12th-century Yemenite rabbi and theologian, and the founder of what is sometimes called "Jewish Ismailism", wrote in his philosophical treatise Bustan al-Uqul ("Garden of Wisdom") that God sends prophets to establish religions for other nations, which do not have to conform to the precepts of the Jewish Torah. Nethanel explicitly considered Muhammad a true prophet, who was sent from Heaven with a particular message that applies to the Arabs, but not to the Jews. Al-Fayyumi's explicit acceptance of Muhammad's prophecy was rare and virtually unknown until recent times beyond his native Yemen.

The apocalyptic Midrash The Secrets of Rabbi Simon ben Yohai, compares Muhammad to the Jewish Messiah. According to this text, ascribed to the famous 1st-century sage and mystic Simeon bar Yochai, and apparently written at the beginning of the Muslim conquest or in the 8th century, Muhammad's role as a prophet includes redeeming the Jews from the Christian ("Roman" or "Edomite") oppression and playing a positive role in the messianic process.

One Yemenite Jewish document, found in the Cairo Genizah, suggests that many Jews had not only accepted Muhammad as a prophet, but had even desecrated Sabbath in order to join Muhammad in his struggle. However, some historians suggest that this document, called Dhimmat an-nabi Muhammad (Muhammad's Writ of Protection), has been fabricated by Yemenite Jews for the purpose of self-defence.

A number of stories from the Islamic tradition about Muhammad entered mainstream Jewish thought incidentally, due to the great cultural convergence in Islamic Spain from the 9th to 12th centuries, known as the Golden Age of Spanish Jewry. For example, Rabbi Jacob Joseph of Polonne, one of the early Hasidic mystics, wrote that one pious man (hasid) taught that the internal struggle against the evil inclination is greater than external battle, quoting Bahya ibn Paquda's popular treatise Chovot HaLevavot. In the Judeo-Arabic original version of that book, Bahya Ibn Paquda refers to both external and internal battle as jihad and the "pious man" about whom the story is originally told is Muhammad, though the author does not mention his source by name.

See also
 Judaism's view of Jesus
 Islamic-Jewish relations
 Muhammad's views on Jews

References

Muhammad
Muhammad
 
Religious perspectives on Muhammad
Point of view